The Deperdussin Coupe Schneider  was an early  racing aircraft built in 1913 by the Aéroplanes Deperdussin, a French aircraft manufacturer started in 1911 and reorganized as the Société Pour L'Aviation et ses Dérivés (SPAD) in 1913. The aircraft is noted for winning the Schneider Trophy 1913.

Design
The Deperdussin Coupe Schneider was a floatplane version of the Deperdussin Monocoque, and like the latter, had a mid-wing design and was of monocoque all-wood construction.

Service history
It entered into the April 16, 1913 Schneider Cup race. Flying it, Maurice Prévost was awarded the Schneider Cup.

Specifications

References

Coupe
Single-engined tractor aircraft
Racing aircraft
1910s French sport aircraft
Mid-wing aircraft
Aircraft first flown in 1913
Rotary-engined aircraft